Joan F. Cohen (born November 2, 1962) is an American attorney and politician. Cohen, a Democrat, served a single two-year term in the Maine House of Representatives from District 113, which included the North Deering neighborhood in Portland as well as a portion of adjacent Falmouth. She earned a bachelor's degree in History for the University of Illinois at Urbana–Champaign (1986) and a J.D. degree from the University of Virginia School of Law (1989). She is married to former Portland Mayor Jim Cohen.

Career
From 1989 to 2000, Cohen practiced law in a variety of ways; she worked as a corporate real estate attorney for Winthrop, Stimson, Putnam & Roberts, served as assistant general counsel to the Maine State Chamber of Commerce (1992–94), general counsel for the Maine Medical Association (1994–98), and owned her own practice (1998-2000).

Political positions
At the time of her election, Cohen favored more restrictions on firearm ownership and was on the board of Maine Citizens Against Handgun Violence. She supported a statewide ban on smoking on bar and restaurant patios and decks, the implementation of a limited local option sales tax, and opposed the teaching of intelligent design in public schools. Cohen, who is Jewish, served on the board of the Jewish Community Alliance and sponsored a joint resolution commemorating the Holocaust.

References

1962 births
Living people
Democratic Party members of the Maine House of Representatives
Politicians from Chicago
Politicians from Portland, Maine
Lawyers from Chicago
Lawyers from Portland, Maine
University of Illinois Urbana-Champaign alumni
University of Virginia School of Law alumni
Jewish American state legislators in Maine
Jews and Judaism in Portland, Maine
Women state legislators in Maine
21st-century American politicians
21st-century American women politicians
21st-century American Jews